Eueides isabella, the Isabella's longwing or Isabella's heliconian, is a species of nymphalid butterfly, belonging to the Heliconiinae subfamily.

Description 
The uppersides of the wings is dark brown, with orange bands and yellowish markings on the edges of the forewings. The undersides of the wings are quite similar to the uppersides, but the edges of the hindwings show a series of small blue spots.

The flight period extends to the whole year in the tropical habitat. They are active even in low light. Caterpillars are white and black covered by long black spines. They are gregarious and they primarily feed on Passiflora platyloba and Passiflora ambigua.

Distribution
This species can be found from Mexico to the Amazon basin and the West Indies.

Habitat
Eueides isabella lives in the rainforest where it remains in the canopy. It can be found from sea level to about 1500 m above sea level.

Subspecies 
 E. i. isabella (French Guiana, Suriname, Trinidad)
 E. i. arquata Stichel, 1903 (Colombia)
 E. i. cleobaea Geyer, 1832 (Cuba, Puerto Rico, Central America)
 E. i. dianasa (Hübner, [1806])
 E. i. dissoluta Stichel, 1903 (Perú, Ecuador)
 E. i. dynastes C. et R. Felder, 1861 (Venezuela, Colombia)
 E. i. ecuadorensis Strand, 1909 (Ecuador)
 E. i. eva (Fabricius, 1793) (Mexico, Honduras, Nicaragua, Panama)
 E. i. hippolinus Butler, 1873 (Peru)
 E. i. huebneri Ménétriés, 1857 (Colombia)
 E. i. melphis (Godart, 1819) (Haití, Antilles)
 E. i. nigricornis Maza, 1982 (Brazil)
 E. i. subspecies (Brazil)

Similar species
Heliconius ismenius – tiger heliconian
Lycorea halia – tiger mimic-queen
Eresia phyillyra – tiger heliconian
Mechanitis lysimnia – confused tigerwing
Mechanitis menapis – variable tigerwing
Mechanitis polymnia – disturbed tigerwing
Hypothyris lycaste – round-spotted ticlear
Hypothyris euclea – common ticlear

References 

 Butterflies of America
 Tree of Life

Heliconiini
Butterflies of North America
Butterflies of Central America
Nymphalidae of South America
Butterflies of Trinidad and Tobago
Lepidoptera of the Caribbean
Lepidoptera of Brazil
Lepidoptera of Colombia
Lepidoptera of French Guiana
Lepidoptera of Venezuela
Fauna of the Amazon
Butterflies described in 1781